"The Straight Dope" was a question-and-answer newspaper column written under the pseudonym Cecil Adams. Contributions were made by multiple authors, and it was illustrated (also pseudonymously) by Slug Signorino. It was first published in 1973 in the Chicago Reader as well as in print syndication nationally in the United States, and on a website with the same name. On more than one occasion, the authors (i.e. Cecil Adams) were forced to retract or modify an answer when confronted by the readers.

Following the column of June 27, 2018, the "Straight Dope" column was placed on hiatus, with no decision made regarding its future. The website and associated forum continue to be active.

Chicago's public radio station, WBEZ, has purchased Sun-Times Media (STM), which owns the Straight Dope, including the SDMB.

Name and tagline
The column derives its name from the American idiom meaning roughly "the true information; the full story" and covers many subjects, including history, science, old wives' tales, urban legends, and inventions.  The column appeared under the tagline: "Fighting ignorance since 1973. (It's taking longer than we thought.)”

Books
Five collections of columns have been published, sometimes referred to as the Straight Dope Cyclopedia of Human Knowledge:
The Straight Dope (1984)
More of the Straight Dope (1988)
Return of the Straight Dope (1994)
The Straight Dope Tells All (1998)
Triumph of the Straight Dope (1999)
In addition, the 1993 collection Know It All was published for younger audiences by Cecil's "assistant" Ed Zotti.

Television
In 1996, the A&E Network briefly aired a show based on the column called The Straight Dope, hosted and co-written by comedian Mike Lukas. A podcast has also been released sporadically.

References

External links
 
 Official forum
 

1973 establishments in the United States
American blogs
Columns (periodical)
Scientific skepticism mass media